Andrea Ackerman is an American artist, theorist and writer best known for her New Media artworks.  She lives and works in New York.

Biography 
At Yale, Ackerman studied physics and biophysics; afterward, she graduated from Harvard Medical School and practiced as a psychiatrist and psychoanalyst. She has used digital technology since the mid-1990s in order to fabricate her work, which dabbles in the realms concerning technology, nature, aesthetics, and ethics. She imbues objects with qualities not ordinarily occurring in nature, and in doing so fabricates a “synthetic” nature. Specific aspects of 2D and 3D still and animation software are applied in subtle ways like using effects meant for fluids on rose petals or skin. Ackerman believes finding meaningful ways to use these effects is essential to the evocation of a seamless transformation - digital to human.

Ackerman has taught 3D computer modeling (Maya) at Pratt Institute in Brooklyn, was a co-director of ISEA2011, and is an editor of Leonardo Electronic Almanac, most recently, the associate editor of Uncontainable, the exhibition catalog of electronic art exhibited at ISEA2011, Istanbul. Ackerman lives in New York, New York with her husband and two children.

Exhibitions

Selected collections 
San Jose Museum of Art

References

Further reading 
 Busack, R. (2005, August 1). "We can build you: Frankenstein's Monster lives on in the works of 15 women artists" at the San Jose Museum of Art's new show about creation and horror. September 7, 2014
 "re-title.com." Andrea Ackerman (Artist) in New York, NY (New York) from. N.p., n.d. Web. 1 Sept. 2014.

External links
Official website

Writing Links
New Media Art Takes as its Subject the Processes of the Brain/Mind by Andrea Ackerman
 http://median.newmediacaucus.org/archives_in_progress/pre_2009_issues/issues.php?f=papers&time=2008_caa&page=ackerman
Some Thoughts Connecting Deterministic Chaos, Neuronal Dynamics and Aesthetic Experience LEA Magazine Article by Andrea Ackerman
 http://www.leoalmanac.org/some-thoughts-connecting-deterministic-chaos-neuronal-dynamics-and-aesthetic-experience-lea-magazine-article/

Living people
American contemporary artists
American women artists
Artists from New York City
Harvard Medical School alumni
New media artists
Pratt Institute faculty
Yale College alumni
Year of birth missing (living people)
American women academics
21st-century American women artists